Makutamleni Maharaju is a 1987 Telugu-language action drama film, produced by B. V. S. N. Prasad under the Sri Krishna Prasanna Pictures banner and directed by K. Bapayya. It stars Krishna, Sridevi, Rajendra Prasad, Chandra Mohan  and music composed by Chakravarthy. The film was remade as the Hindi movie Amiri Garibi (1990). The film was recorded as a Super Hit at the box office.

Plot
Pardhasaradhi (Krishna) is an idealistic young man. His father Raghavaiah (Rao Gopal Rao) does not see eye to eye with him. He ostracizes Pardhasaradhi and asks him to leave their village. Pardhasaradhi becomes enemies with J.B.(Nutan Prasad) and his gang. Meanwhile, a wealthy industrialist, Sivaram Prasad (Gummadi) comes to visit his childhood friend Raghavaiah. He proposes a marriage alliance between Raghavaiah's daughter Sumathi (Poornima) and his son Mohan (Rajendra Prasad). Pardhasaradhi secretly attends his sister's wedding. A dancer named Saroja (Sridevi) comes to perform at the wedding. Mohan is attracted to Saroja but she rejects him as she in love with Pardhasaradhi. When Sumathi arrives at her in-law's house, she is not welcomed by her mother-in-law Rajyalakshmi (Y. Vijaya) and her sisters-in-law, Rekha (Mucherla Aruna) and Rani (Chandrika). Ganapathi (Chandra Mohan), Pardhasaradhi's childhood friend, arrives in the city. Here he learns that Sivaram Prasad is his maternal uncle and that he was wedded to his cousin Rekha as a child. Now Ganapathi wants to take his wife Rekha back home with him, much to the chagrin of Rekha and her family. Mohan tries to trap Saroja, but she does not yield. Pardhasaradhi learns about Sumathi's trials. So, to protect Saroja and also for the betterment of his sister's life, Pardhasaradhi marries Saroja. Sivaram Prasad suddenly passes away, leaving Sumathi to the mercy of her mother-in-law, who immediately turns her out of the house. Meanwhile, J.B. and his gang kill Saroja's brother-in-law Joga Rao (Devadas Kanakala) and implicate Pardhasaradhi in the crime. He breaks out of jail when his father seeks his help for his sister. J.B. and his gang tell Mohan that they plan to get him married, but double-cross him to teach Pardhasaradhi a lesson. Pardhasaradhi rescues Mohan who realizes his mistake. Finally, Pardhasaradhi defeats the villains and reunites the family.

Cast

Krishna as Pardhasaradhi
Sridevi as Saroja
Rajendra Prasad as Mohan
Chandra Mohan as Ganapati 
Rao Gopal Rao as Raghavaiah 
Gummadi as Sivaram Prasad  
Nutan Prasad as J. B.
Chalapathi Rao as Robert 
Paruchuri Venkateswara Rao as Kodandapaani
Rallapalli as Tukaram
Narra Venkateswara Rao as Dasu
Devadas Kanakala as Joga Rao
Malladi as Ramadasu Master
Jaya Bhaskar as Lawyer
C. H. Krishna Murthy as Rangadu
Telephone Satyanarayana as Jailor Siva Prasad
Gadiraju Subba Rao as Narasimhulu
Chidatala Appa Rao as Bus Conductor
Satti Babu as Priest
Annapurna as Janaki
Mucherla Aruna as Rekha
Poornima as Sumathi
K. Vijaya
Chandrika as Rani
Y. Vijaya as Rajyalakshmi
Nirmalamma as Kanthamma

Soundtrack

Music composed by Chakravarthy. Lyrics were written by Veturi. Music released on LEO Audio Company.

References

External links
 

Indian action drama films
Telugu films remade in other languages
Films directed by K. Bapayya
Films scored by K. Chakravarthy
1980s action drama films
1980s Telugu-language films